Wiliam Paulet may refer to:

William Paulet, 1st Marquess of Winchester (1483–1572), English courtier 
William Paulet, 3rd Marquess of Winchester (1532–1598), English courtier, son of John Paulet, 2nd Marquess of Winchester 
William Paulet, 4th Marquess of Winchester (bef. 1598 – 1628), English courtier, son of William Paulet, 3rd Marquess of Winchester
William Paulet, Lord St John (1587/88–1621), son of William Paulet, 4th Marquess of Winchester
Lord William Paulet (1804–1893), son of the 13th Marquess and British Army officer

See also 
 William Poulett (disambiguation)